Cynthia Denise Bailey (born February 19, 1967) is an American model, reality television personality, and actress. Born and raised in Alabama, she moved to New York City at the age of 18 to pursue a modeling career. There, she signed a five-year contract with Wilhelmina Models, and subsequently appeared as a model in various magazines and advertising campaigns. She worked as a runway model in Paris and Milan.

Bailey has acted in films, including Without You I'm Nothing (1990) and For Love or Money (1993), and on television programs, such as The Cosby Show. She joined the reality television show The Real Housewives of Atlanta in 2010. She married Peter Thomas in 2010, and their divorce was finalized in 2017. Her relationship with sportscaster Mike Hill was showcased on Real Housewives of Atlanta from 2018 until she left the series in 2021.

Early life 
Cynthia Denise Bailey was born on February 19, 1967, in Decatur, Alabama, and raised in Tuscumbia. Her father, Elijah, worked at an auto factory and her mother, Barbara, worked at a sewing factory. Barbara was 18 when she was pregnant with Cynthia, and had another daughter, Malorie, roughly a year later. While growing up, Cynthia was inspired by her grandmother, Mae Frankie Ford, who worked in a sewing factory, sold hotdogs and hamburgers, cleaned houses, and volunteered to care for an elderly woman. She described Ford as "the first female black entrepreneur in [her] life".

Bailey enrolled in freshman-level courses at the University of Alabama in Huntsville, and competed in local beauty pageants. She was the first African American homecoming queen at Deshler High School. After winning the event, she participated in a homecoming queen pageant. Even though she did not win, she was contacted by a Wilhelmina Models talent scout. At age 18, she moved to New York City and signed a five-year contract with the modeling agency. She raised the money for the move through part-time work at a mall.

Career

1985–2009: Early modeling career 

Bailey appeared in the 1985 low-budget film The Dark Power and the 1989 music video for New Order's "Round & Round". In 1990, she played Roxanne in the film Without You I'm Nothing, and remained friends with its star Sandra Bernhard. Naomi Campbell was considered for the role. Bailey appeared in a 1990 episode of the sitcom The Cosby Show. Her audition for a role in the 1991 film The Five Heartbeats was featured in the 2018 documentary The Making of the Five Heartbeats. In 1993, she played a model in the film For Love or Money, and the following year, she appeared in the music video for Heavy D's single "Nuttin But Love" from the album of the same name. She played a masseuse in a 1995 episode of New York Undercover.

After working as a runway model in Paris and Milan for a year, Bailey returned to New York City and modeled for Maybelline, Oil of Olay, and Target and in magazines including Vogue, Glamour, Elle, and Vanity Fair. She appeared on two Essence magazine covers in June 1995her first job as a modeland 1997. The magazine's then editor-in-chief Susan L. Taylor described Bailey as one of her favorite models. Bailey's favorite modeling job was a Vanity Cover shot by Annie Leibovitz and featuring Iman, Beverly Johnson, Naomi Campbell, and Tyra Banks; Iman had invited Bailey to participate in the shoot.

2010–2016: The Real Housewives of Atlanta and other work 
In 2010, Bailey joined the reality television show The Real Housewives of Atlanta, which featured her relationship with club owner Peter Thomas and her friendship with NeNe Leakes. She was introduced in the show's third season along with Phaedra Parks. Bailey was initially uncertain about joining the show, describing it as "too dramatic", but changed her mind after viewing it as a business opportunity. She was contacted by Bravo shortly after moving to Atlanta with Thomas; the network said that they "wanted to bring more class to the cast, and feature more women that already had successful careers before the show".

In 2011, Bailey opened her modeling school, Bailey Agency School of Fashion in Atlanta; the following year, she held a model search in several cites in the Southern United States as part of a contest to win representation by a New York modeling agency. Bailey appeared in a trilogy of music videos ("Age Ain't a Factor", "Baby x3", and "Chase Forever") for Jaheim's 2013 album Appreciation Day. In the "Age Ain't a Factor" video, she was shown in a fictional Essence article on "Ageless Beauty", alongside LisaRaye McCoy and Vivica A. Fox. The "Baby x3" video focuses on infidelity with Bailey and Thomas portraying "secret lovers".

Bailey appeared in the 2015 documentary series Black Friday, which is about how little consumer spending is retained within black communities. The same year, she acted in Kenya Moore's television pilot, Life Twirls On. For the character, she used a Jamaican accent. In 2016, she had a minor role in the film Sharknado: The 4th Awakens, and guest starred on The Next :15 alongside former The Real Housewives of Atlanta costar Claudia Jordan. She was featured on a celebrity edition of Cupcake Wars with Nene Leakes.

2017–present: Professional expansion 
Bailey was a guest judge for the preliminary and finals competition of the 65th Miss Universe competition. In 2018, Bailey signed a contract with the New York-based agency Major Models; her daughter is also signed with the company. In April 2018, Bailey underwent surgery to remove a lipoma tumor from her left shoulder blade. The procedure was successful without any reported complications. In 2019, Bailey guest starred in an episode of Last Call, and acted in How High 2, the sequel to the 2001 film How High. She started a line of bags, named CB VIOR, as well as a line of candles, leather goods, and eyewear.

Bailey opened a wine bar, The Bailey Wine Cellar, and an event space, The Bailey Room, in Grant Park, Atlanta in July 2019. The same year, she had a partnership with Seagram, creating a signature drink, a Bellini cocktail. It was sold in April 2019. The launch party was shown on an eleventh season episode of The Real Housewives of Atlanta. In it, Leakes is angry that Bailey had invited Kenya Moore to the event without her knowledge. The incident was discussed during the season's reunion episodes, and Leakes and Bailey publicly ended their friendship. Bailey is a brand ambassador for Seagram since 2018. In 2019, she guest-starred on Star and Tales.

Bailey chose to leave The Real Housewives of Atlanta in 2021, after being a part of the series for eleven seasons. She starred in the first season of The Real Housewives Ultimate Girls Trip a spin-off featuring various women from The Real Housewives franchise, which premiered on Peacock in 2021. In an Essence interview conducted in the same year, she said she was shifting her focus from reality television to acting. Bailey had a recurring role in the second season of Games People Play as documentarian Ndasia.

In 2022, Bailey competed as a HouseGuest the third season of Celebrity Big Brother, placing third in the competition. The same year, she appeared in the 2022 Lifetime movie Cruel Instruction.

Personal life

Bailey dated Jayson Williams in 1996, and he proposed to her during a New Jersey Nets halftime show. She rejected the proposal and returned the engagement ring to him. She also turned down a marriage proposal from Russell Simmons. Bailey had a romantic relationship with Leon Robinson, and on November 9, 1999, she gave birth to their daughter, Noelle. During her pregnancy, Bailey learned she had a uterine fibroid, which she described as "the size of a grape"; she chose to treat this with uterine fibroid embolization rather than a hysterectomy since she wanted the option of having more children in the future. She partnered with USA Fibroids Centers to raise awareness about fibroids and treatment options.

Bailey married Peter Thomas on July 24, 2010, at the Fernbank Museum of Natural History; the wedding was shown on a season three episode of The Real Housewives of Atlanta. In 2013, Bailey and Thomas published a book about their relationship entitled Carry-On Baggage: Our Nonstop Flight.

Bailey and Thomas publicly announced their separation in 2016, and their divorce was finalized in March 2017. Bailey moved with her daughter to a house that she calls "Lake Bailey". She initially wanted an apartment, saying that she wanted "the New York City sort of lifestyle", but producers from The Real Housewives of Atlanta convinced her to purchase a home instead.

Bailey publicly announced her relationship with Fox Sports correspondent Mike Hill in August 2018. Hill and Bailey became engaged in July 2019, and were married on October 10, 2020. Bailey said that due to the COVID-19 pandemic, strict rules were implemented for the wedding, such as mandatory social distancing and face masks or face shields, to protect the 250 guests and a deep cleaning of the Acworth, Georgia venue. However, Bailey received criticism on social media following the release of pictures and videos that showed guests not wearing masks. She announced in October 2022 that she filed for divorce from Hill, which was finalized the same year.

Filmography

Films

Television

Music video appearances

References

1967 births
21st-century African-American women
21st-century American actresses
Actresses from Alabama
African-American actresses
African-American female models
American female models
Living people
The Real Housewives cast members
The Real Housewives of Atlanta
20th-century African-American people
20th-century African-American women
People from Atlanta
People from Tuscumbia, Alabama
People from New York City
Participants in American reality television series